Shihua could refer to the following locations in China:

Shihua, Hubei (石花镇), town in Gucheng County, Xiangyang, Hubei
Written as "石化":
Shihua Subdistrict, Handan, in Fuxing District, Handan, Hebei
Shihua Subdistrict, Songyuan, in Ningjiang District, Songyuan, Jilin
Shihua Subdistrict, Shanghai, in Jinshan District
Shihua Subdistrict, Ürümqi, in Midong District, Ürümqi, Xinjiang
Shihua Road Subdistrict, Daguan District, Anqing, Anhui